Eusthenopteron (from  , 'good', 'strength', and   'wing' or 'fin') is a genus of prehistoric sarcopterygian (often called lobe-finned fishes) which has attained an iconic status from its close relationships to tetrapods. Early depictions of this animal show it emerging onto land; however, paleontologists now widely agree that it was a strictly aquatic animal. The genus Eusthenopteron is known from several species that lived during the Late Devonian period, about 385 million years ago. Eusthenopteron was first described by J. F. Whiteaves in 1881, as part of a large collection of fishes from Miguasha, Quebec. Some 2,000 Eusthenopteron specimens have been collected from Miguasha, one of which was the object of intensely detailed study and several papers from the 1940s to the 1990s by paleoichthyologist Erik Jarvik.

Description

Eusthenopteron is medium to large sized tristichopterid, E. foordi is estimated to exceed , while E. jenkinsi probably reached .

The earliest-known fossilized evidence of bone marrow has been found in Eusthenopteron, which may be the origin of bone marrow in tetrapods.

Eusthenopteron shares many unique features in common with the earliest-known tetrapods. It shares a similar pattern of skull roofing bones with forms such as Ichthyostega and Acanthostega. Eusthenopteron, like other tetrapodomorph fishes, had internal nostrils, (or a choana) which are one of the defining traits of tetrapodomorphs (including tetrapods). It also had labyrinthodont teeth, characterized by infolded enamel, which characterizes all of the earliest known tetrapods as well.

Unlike the early tetrapods, they did not have larval gills.

Classification 

Like other fish-like sarcopterygians, Eusthenopteron possessed a two-part cranium, which hinged at mid-length along an intracranial joint. Eusthenopterons notoriety comes from the pattern of its fin endoskeleton, which bears a distinct humerus, ulna, and radius (in the fore-fin) and femur, tibia, and fibula (in the pelvic fin). These appendicular long bones had epiphyseal growth plates that allowed substantial longitudinal growth through endochondral ossification, as in tetrapod long bones. These six appendicular bones also occur in tetrapods and are a synapomorphy of a large clade of sarcopterygians, possibly Tetrapodomorpha (the humerus and femur are present in all sarcopterygians). Similarly, its elasmoid scales lack superficial odontodes composed of dentine and enamel; this loss appears to be a synapomorphy with more crownward tetrapodomorphs.

Eusthenopteron differs significantly from some later Carboniferous tetrapods in the apparent absence of a recognized larval stage and a definitive metamorphosis. In even the smallest known specimen of Eusthenopteron foordi (at 29 mm), the lepidotrichia cover all of the fins, which does not happen until after metamorphosis in genera like Polyodon. This might indicate that Eusthenopteron developed directly, with the hatchling already attaining the adult's general body form (Cote et al., 2002).

See also 
 Gogonasus
 Tiktaalik – an even more tetrapod-like sarcopterygian

References

External links

 https://web.archive.org/web/20060313170715/http://www.palaeos.com/Vertebrates/Units/140Sarcopterygii/140.860.html

Tristichopterids
Extinct animals of North America
Prehistoric lobe-finned fish genera
Devonian bony fish
Late Devonian animals
Late Devonian fish
Transitional fossils